Live Damage is Dark Tranquillity's first live DVD album. It contains an approximately 85-minute-long live show recorded in Krzemionki Studio TVP, Kraków, Poland on October 7, 2002. The DVD is from their Damage Done tour.

Bonus material on the disc includes bootleg recordings from Essen, Athens and Paris, an interview with the band, their biography and individual members' profiles, Band biography, discography, photo gallery, art gallery, desktop images, web links and two music videos.

Track listing

Bonus material
Live in Essen (One Camera Bootleg Video Footage Recordings):

Live in *Athens/**Paris (Bootleg Songs):

Bonus Videos:

Track Information
From Live Damage
Track 1 is from Live Damage
Track 2, 6, 10 & 17 are from  HavenTrack 3, 5, 8, 11, 13, 15, 20 & 21 are from Damage DoneTrack 4, 12 & 19 are from The Mind's ITrack 7 & 16 are from The GalleryTrack 9, 14 & 18 is from Projector''

Credits

Dark Tranquillity
 Mikael Stanne - vocals
 Niklas Sundin - lead guitar, art direction and design
 Martin Henriksson - rhythm guitar
 Anders Jivarp - drums
 Michael Nicklasson - bass guitar
 Martin Brändström - keyboards and electronics

Guests
Essen filming
Zeche Carl
Marcel "King of Crange" Denghaus

Athens filming
John Hiotellis 
George Kotios 
Art Direction and Design  
Tomasz "Dziuba" Dziubiński 
Joerg Lindermann

Show arrangements in Athens
Makis Naskos
Harry Katinakis 
Omicron Music
Marius Karlsen

Paris filming
Marius Karlsen

Photography 
Andrzej Glue   
Volker Beushausen   

Dark Tranquillity albums
2003 video albums
Live video albums
2003 live albums
Century Media Records live albums
Century Media Records video albums